Irena Pawełczyk (born 9 March 1934 in Katowice) is a Polish luger who competed in the early 1960s. She won the gold medal in the women's singles event at the 1962 FIL European Luge Championships in Weissenbach, Austria.

Pawełczyk also finished fourth in the women's singles event at the 1964 Winter Olympics in Innsbruck.

References
 List of European luge champions 
 Wallenchinsky, David. (1984). "Luge: Women's Singles". In The Complete Book the Olympics: 1896-1980. New York: Penguin Books. p. 577.
 

Lugers at the 1964 Winter Olympics
Polish female lugers
Living people
1934 births
Olympic lugers of Poland
Sportspeople from Katowice